{{Drugbox
| IUPAC_name = (RS)-''N-{3-Acetyl-4-[3-(tert-butylamino)-2-hydroxypropoxy]phenyl}-N,N-diethylurea
| image = Celiprolol.svg
| width = 200px
| chirality = Racemic mixture

| tradename =  
| Drugs.com = 
| pregnancy_category =  
| legal_status =  
| routes_of_administration =

| bioavailability = 30-70%
| metabolism =  
| elimination_half-life = 5 hours
| excretion =

| CAS_number = 56980-93-9
| ATC_prefix = C07
| ATC_suffix = AB08
| PubChem = 2663
| DrugBank_Ref = 
| DrugBank = DB04846
| ChemSpiderID = 2563
| UNII_Ref = 
| UNII = DRB57K47QC
| KEGG = D07660
| ChEMBL = 27810

| C=20 | H=33 | N=3 | O=4 
| smiles = O=C(N(CC)CC)Nc1ccc(OCC(O)CNC(C)(C)C)c(c1)C(=O)C
}}Celiprolol''' is a medication in the class of beta blockers, used in the treatment of high blood pressure. It has a unique pharmacology: it is a selective β1 receptor antagonist, but a β2 receptor partial agonist.  It is also a weak α2 receptor antagonist.

It was patented in 1973 and approved for medical use in 1982.

Medical use
Celiprolol is believed to provide clinical benefit for people with vascular Ehlers–Danlos syndrome by promoting normal collagen synthesis in the blood vessels, and by shifting the pressure load away from the vessels most prone to dissection and rupture. In 2019, a new drug application (NDA) for celiprolol was denied by the U.S. Food and Drug Administration (FDA), instead calling for an “adequate and well-controlled” trial to determine whether celiprolol reduced the risk of clinical events in patients with vEDS.

Brand names
Brand names include Cardem, Selectol, Celipres, Celipro, Celol, Cordiax, Dilanorm

References

External links 
 Selectol Summary of Product Characteristics (from the IPHA Medicines Compendium)
 Celiprolol data sheet for New Zealand

Beta blockers
Ureas
Aromatic ketones
N-tert-butyl-phenoxypropanolamines